Trochus nigropunctatus, common name the black-spotted topshell, is a species of sea snail, a marine gastropod mollusk in the family Trochidae, the top snails.

Description
The shell is rather largely, excavately umbilicated, and shortly conical. Its color is ashgreen, obliquely flamed with black. The whorls are flatly convex, spirally very closely gemmed with regular grains. The base is grain-ridged. The interstices are crispately decussated with ridges dotted with black. The dots are conspicuous, distant.

The surface of this species is grained with unusual regularity, and the base is very characteristically sprinkled at rather distant intervals with blue-black dots.

Distribution
This marine species occurs off Indo-Malaysia, Oceania, the Philippines, and Australia (Northern Territory, Queensland, Western Australia)

References

 Reeve, L.A. 1842. New species of the genera Trochus and Turbo. Proceedings of the Zoological Society of London 1842: 184-186
 Reeve, L.A. 1842. Conchologia Systematica or Complete System of Conchology: in which the Lepades and Conchiferous Mollusca are described and classified according to their natural organization and habits. London : Longman, Brown, Green & Longmans Vol. 2 337 pp., pls 131–300. 
 Lamarck, J.B. 1822. Histoire naturelle des Animaux sans Vertèbres. Paris : J.B. Lamarck Vol. 7 711 pp. (junior homonym of Trochus lineatus da Costa, 1778)
 Blainville, H.M.D. de 1828. Vers et Zoophytes. pp. 259-270 in Levrault, F.G. (ed.). Dictionnaire des Sciences Naturelles. Paris & Strassburg : Levrault Vol. 52
 Deshayes, G.P. 1843. Histoire naturelle des animaux sans vertèbres. Paris : J.B. Baillière Vol. 9 728 pp
 Adams, A. 1853. Contributions towards a monograph of the Trochidae, a family of gastropodous Mollusca. Proceedings of the Zoological Society of London 1851(19): 150-192
 Reeve, L.A. 1862. Monograph of the genus Trochus. pls 1–16 in Reeve, L.A. (ed). Conchologia Iconica. London : L. Reeve & Co. Vol. 13. 
 Fischer, P. 1876. Genres Calcar, Trochus, Xenophora, Tectarius et Risella. pp. 97–114 in Keiner, L.C. (ed.). Spécies general et iconographie des coquilles vivantes. Paris : J.B. Baillière Vol. 11. 
 ilsbry, H.A. 1889. Manual of Conchology. Philadelphia : Academy of Natural Sciences Philadelphia Vol. 11 519 pp., pls 1-67.
 Hedley, C. 1916. A preliminary index of the Mollusca of Western Australia. Journal and Proceedings of the Royal Society of Western Australia 1: 152-226
 Hedley, C. 1918. Narrative of an expedition of exploration in North Western Australia by Herbert Basedow. Special Report. Mollusca. Transactions of the Royal Geographical Society of Australasia, South Australian Branch 18: 263-283 
 Thiele, J. 1930. Gastropoda und Bivalvia. pp. 561–596 in Michaelsen, W. & Hartmayer, R. (eds). Die Fauna Südwest-Australiens. Jena : Gustav Fischer Vol. 5
 Allan, J.K. 1950. Australian Shells: with related animals living in the sea, in freshwater and on the land. Melbourne : Georgian House xix, 470 pp., 45 pls, 112 text figs.
 Wilson, B.R. & Gillett, K. 1971. Australian Shells: illustrating and describing 600 species of marine gastropods found in Australian waters. Sydney : Reed Books 168 pp
 Blackburn, H. & Green, J. 1976. Marine shells of the Darwin area. Darwin : Museums and Art Galleries Board of the Northern Territory pp. 1–23.
 Cernohorsky, W.O. 1978. Tropical Pacific marine shells. Sydney : Pacific Publications 352 pp., 68 pls.
 Wells, F.E. & Bryce, C.W. 1986. Seashells of Western Australia. Perth : Western Australian Museum 207 pp.
 Wilson, B. 1993. Australian Marine Shells. Prosobranch Gastropods. Kallaroo, Western Australia : Odyssey Publishing Vol. 1 408 pp.
 Wilson, B. 2002. A Handbook to Australian Seashells on Seashores East to West and North to South. Sydney : Reed New Holland 185 pp.

External links
 

nigropunctatus
Gastropods described in 1861